SN 2003H was a supernova that appeared halfway between the colliding NGC 2207 and IC 2163 galaxies. It was discovered on January 8, 2003, by the Lick Observatory and Tenagra Supernova Searches (LOTOSS).

References

External links
 Spectra on the Open Supernova Catalog
 Simbad

Canis Major
20030108
Supernovae